Ludvig Teodor Almqvist (4 January 1818 in Gränna, Sweden – August 26, 1884, on the island of Selaön), a Swedish politician, was the son of Sven Johan Almqvist, vicar and priest.

He served as the Minister for Civil Service Affairs in Louis De Geer’s first cabinet (1856–1860). In 1867, he was elected to be first deputy speaker of the Upper House of the Swedish Parliament. On November 2, 1860, he took his place as member of the Supreme Court of Sweden. In 1867, he became Chief Justice of the Svea Court of Appeal; in 1870, he became a member of the Supreme Court of Sweden again. Almqvist served as Minister for Justice in Louis De Geer’s second cabinet (1879–1880).

He was made Knight of the Order of the Seraphim in 1882. On August 26, 1884, he died at the Algö Estate on Selaön.

Ludvig married Sophie Antoinette Eugenie Björkman in 1851. Their daughter, Carolina "Lina" Almqvist, married Erik Gustaf Boström, who went on to become Prime Minister of Sweden. Ludvig's brother, Johan Magnus Almqvist, was a theologian and politician, who served as a member of Parliament for the clergy and so on.

1818 births
1884 deaths
Members of the Riksdag
Swedish Ministers for Justice
Justices of the Supreme Court of Sweden
19th-century Swedish judges
19th-century Swedish politicians